Deondre Francois (born February 12, 1997) is an American football quarterback for the Orlando Guardians of the XFL. He played college football for Hampton University and  Florida State University.

Early life and background
When Francois was a young child, he moved numerous times bouncing back and forth from Miami to Orlando. His mother Janice moved him and his family from Little Haiti, a neighborhood of Miami, to Orlando for a better life around the 4th grade. He first started playing football at the age of nine for the Orlando Outlaws with his godfather, Barry White.

Francois attended Olympia High School in Orlando, Florida his first three years of high school and transferred to IMG Academy in Bradenton, Florida his senior year. From 2012 to 2013 at Olympia, he passed for 3,162 yards and 28 touchdowns for the football team. As a senior, he passed for 1,488 yards with 18 touchdowns. Francois was considered a four-star recruit and committed to Florida State University to play college football.

College career

Florida State
Francois redshirted his first year at Florida State in 2015. 

Francois competed with Sean Maguire for the starting quarterback job in 2016. After Maguire suffered an injury, Francois was considered the favorite to start the season opener.
On September 5, 2016, Francois made his first collegiate start against the Ole Miss Rebels. Francois passed for 419 yards and two touchdowns, leading the way on a 22-point comeback victory, the largest comeback in Florida State football history. He would be the quarterback for the rest of the season. The Seminoles finished the season 10–3, 5–3 in ACC play, to finish in second place in the Atlantic Division. They were invited to the 2016 Orange Bowl, where they defeated the Michigan Wolverines.

On September 2, 2017, in the Seminoles' first game of the year, Francois injured his patellar tendon that ending his season.

Francois returned to the starting role in 2018. Francois finished the season with 2,731 passing yards on 396 attempts while completing 227 of them (57.3%) with 15 touchdowns to 12 interceptions. On February 3, 2019, it was announced that Francois had been removed from the Florida State football program after a video of a domestic dispute between him and his girlfriend surfaced on social media.

On May 20, 2019, it was announced that Francois would attempt to walk-on at Florida Atlantic, however, this "never materialized."

Hampton
On August 2, 2019, it was announced that Francois had completed a graduate transfer to Hampton and would be immediately eligible for the upcoming season.

Statistics

Professional career

FCF
In December 2020, Francois signed with Fan Controlled Football. Originally a member of the Glacier Boyz, Francois joined the depth chart as the backup QB behind former UConn QB, David Pindell and played in the first game of the season, completing 3 passes on 5 attempts for 36 yards and one TD with 9 yards rushing. 

The following week, Francois was drafted to the Wild Aces and made his debut against the Beasts, starting in front of QB Ed Couch. Francois threw only two passes the entire game, both ending in touchdowns for 40 yards in the 30–28 loss against the Beasts. 

In Week Four, Francois was drafted back to the Glacier Boyz and started against his former team, the Wild Aces, where he threw for an FCF-career-high 88 yards on 6 completions and two touchdowns in the 52–56 loss. He also rushed for one touchdown.

In his first FCF playoff appearance, Francois threw for 5–8 on 91 yards for four touchdowns and rushed on two attempts for 37 yards and one touchdown for a total of 5 touchdowns, leading the Glacier Boyz to the first-ever People's Championship in a 38–20 loss.

TSL Blues
In 2021, Francois began his career in The Spring League, a developmental football league of eight teams, as the starting quarterback of the Blues of the South Division.

FCF (second stint)
Francois was signed by the FCF in 2022 and was drafted by the Bored Ape Football Club as the first pick of Fan Controlled Football's "Season 2.0" inaugural draft. He started week one against the Knights of Degen, throwing 4–9 for 60 yards with a 44% completion rate and one touchdown and one interception. Francois was franchise tagged for week two by the Bored Ape Football Club.

Orlando Guardians
Francois was identified among nine quarterbacks training with Jordan Palmer for a potential quarterback position in the XFL in September 2022. On September 29, 2022, XFL Reporter Mike Mitchell reported that eight of the nine quarterbacks that worked with Palmer reportedly signed with each team. Francois was signed to the Orlando Guardians. 

Francois was a healthy scratch in the Guardians' opening game.

Career statistics

FCF

TSL

XFL

References

External links
Florida State Seminoles bio
Hampton Pirates bio

Living people
Players of American football from Orlando, Florida
American football quarterbacks
Florida State Seminoles football players
American sportspeople of Haitian descent
1997 births
Hampton Pirates football players
African-American players of American football
Fan Controlled Football players
The Spring League players
Orlando Guardians players
21st-century African-American sportspeople